Jirayu Niamthaisong (born 29 September 1996), is a Thai professional footballer who plays as a midfielder.

References

1997 births
Living people
Jirayu Niamthaisong
Association football midfielders
Jirayu Niamthaisong
Jirayu Niamthaisong